Persecution of Baháʼís occurs in various countries, especially in Iran, where the Baháʼí Faith originated and where one of the largest Baháʼí populations in the world is located. The origins of the persecution stem from a variety of Baháʼí teachings which are inconsistent with traditional Islamic beliefs, including the finality of Muhammad's prophethood, and the placement of Baháʼís outside the Islamic religion. Thus, Baháʼís are seen as apostates from Islam.

Baháʼí spokespeople, as well as the United Nations, Amnesty International, the European Union, the United States, and peer-reviewed academic literature have stated that the members of the Baháʼí community in Iran have been subjected to unwarranted arrests, false imprisonment, beatings, torture, unjustified executions, confiscation and destruction of property owned by Baháʼí individuals and the Baháʼí community, denial of employment, denial of government benefits, denial of civil rights and liberties, and denial of access to higher education. Baháʼís have also been significantly persecuted in Egypt.

Historical context

The Baháʼí Faith was established in 1863 by Baháʼu'lláh in Qajar Persia. Eighty-nine percent of Iranians adhere to the Twelver branch of Shiʻa Islam, which holds as a core doctrine the expected advent of a messianic figure known as the Qa'im or as the Imam Mahdi. The Báb claimed he was the Imam Mahdi and thus he had equal status to Muhammad with the power, which he exercised, to abrogate the final provisions of Islamic law.

Baháʼu'lláh, a Bábí who claimed to be the one foretold by the Báb, claimed a similar station for himself in 1863 as a Manifestation of God and as the promised figure foretold in the sacred scriptures of the major religious traditions of the past and founded what later came to be known as the Baháʼí Faith.

Concerning the historical context of the persecutions, Friedrich W. Affolter in "War Crimes, Genocide, & Crimes against Humanity" writes:

In addition to this, the Bábí religion, the forerunner of the Baháʼí Faith, did not passively accept its persecution. Friedrich W. Affolter writes:

Others have stated that the Bábís originally armed themselves and prepared for a holy war that became defensive when they encountered state troops in several locations and that two to three thousand Bábís were killed.

Baháʼu'lláh took a more conciliatory position, forbidding the use of holy war to spread his faith. Instead, he attempted to engage various governments in dialogue; however, the radical nature of his claim to prophethood did little to change the perception of the people of Iran. To this day, Baháʼís are a widely persecuted minority group in Iran and other predominantly Muslim countries, since they are seen as apostates from Islam, and supporters of the West and Israel.

Iran

Legal context
The Iranian constitution that was drafted during the Iranian Constitutional Revolution in 1906 set the groundwork for the institutionalized persecution of Baháʼís. While the constitution was modelled on Belgium's 1831 constitution, the provisions guaranteeing freedom of worship were omitted. Subsequent legislation provided some recognition to Zoroastrians, Jews and Christians as equal citizens under state law, but it did not guarantee freedom of religion and "gave unprecedented institutional powers to the clerical establishment."

The Islamic Republic of Iran, that was established after the Iranian revolution, recognizes four religions, whose status is formally protected: Zoroastrianism, Judaism, Christianity, and Islam. Members of the first three minority religions receive special treatment under Iranian law. For example, their members are allowed to drink alcohol, and representatives of several minority communities are guaranteed seats in parliament.

However, religious freedom in Iran is far from absolute. Conversion away from Islam (apostasy) is forbidden, with both converts and missionaries risking prison. Those seeking to start a new religious group (whether Muslim or not) face severe restrictions.

The Baháʼí Faith faces an additional, technical hurdle. Iranian law recognizes all those who accept the existence of God and the prophethood of Muhammad as Muslims. Baháʼís accept both of these precepts; however, Baháʼís recognize the Báb and Baháʼu'lláh as additional messengers that have appeared after Muhammad. Muslims, on the other hand, assert the finality of Muhammad's revelation. Iranian law therefore treats Baháʼís as "heretics" rather than members of an independent religion, as they describe themselves.

Other unrecognized Iranian religious minorities include the Ahl-e Haqq, the Mandaeans and Azalis. According to the government of Iran, Non-Muslims comprise less than 1% of Iran's population. (See Religion in Iran.)

Early 20th century and the Pahlavi Dynasty

Political context
At least one scholar has described Baháʼís in Iran prior to the Islamic Republic as "a political pawn". Government toleration of Baháʼís being in accord with secular Western ideas of freedom of worship was "a way of showing mullahs who was boss." Correspondingly, since the Baháʼís were a relatively small minority and most Iranians followed traditional beliefs of Apostasy in Islam, when the government was politically weak and in need of clerical support, withdrawal of government protection to "allow active persecution of the Baháʼís," was a "low cost pawn that could be sacrificed to the mullahs". Thus during the heyday of secular ruler Reza Shah Baháʼís were protected; while in 1955, when Reza Shah's son, Mohammad Reza Shah, needed clerical support for the Baghdad Pact and with the 1953 Iranian coup d'état only two years past, Baháʼís were attacked.

History

Starting in the twentieth century, in addition to repression that impacted individual Baháʼís, centrally-directed campaigns that targeted the entire Baháʼí community and institutions were initiated. Some of these persecutions were recorded by missionaries who were in the areas at the time of the massacres. In one case in Yazd in 1903 more than 100 Baháʼís were killed. Later on Baháʼí schools, such as the Tarbiyat boys' and girl's schools in Tehran, were closed in the 1930s and '40s, Baháʼí marriages were not recognized and Baháʼí literature was censored.

During the reign of Mohammad Reza Pahlavi, due to the growing nationalism and the economic difficulties in the country, the Shah gave up control over certain religious affairs to the clergy of the country. Among other things, the power sharing resulted in a campaign of persecution against the Baháʼís. Akhavi has suggested it is likely the government had hoped that by orchestrating a movement against the Baháʼís it could serve to obscure the fact that revenues obtained by the distribution of oil from western oil companies was going to be too low for the growing nationalistic sentiment; it would also serve to gain the support of the clergy for their foreign policy. They approved and coordinated the anti-Baháʼí campaign to incite public passion against the Baháʼís started in 1955 and included the spreading of anti-Baháʼí propaganda in national radio stations and official newspapers.

During the month of Ramadan in 1955, Sheikh Mohammad Taqi Falsafi, a populist preacher, started one of the highest-profile anti-Baháʼí propaganda schemes. After receiving permission from the Shah to state anti-Baháʼí rhetoric in his sermons, he encouraged other clergy to discuss the Baháʼí issue in their sermons. These sermons caused mob violence against Baháʼís; Baháʼí properties were destroyed, Baháʼí centres were looted, Baháʼí cemeteries desecrated, Baháʼís were killed, some hacked to pieces, Baháʼí women were abducted and forced to marry Muslims, and Baháʼís were expelled and dismissed from schools and employment. During the third week of the sermons the National Baháʼí Centre in Tehran was occupied by the military and its dome later destroyed. The Minister of the Interior, Amir Asadollah Alam, wrote in his memoirs:
<blockquote>Falsafi managed to fool both the Shah and the military authorities and start a campaign against the Baháʼís that dragged the country to the edge of disaster. It was Ramadan. [Falsafi's] noon sermons were broadcast throughout the nation via radio and caused violence and terror in many locations. People killed a few Baháʼís here and there. Falsafi justified these acts by saying that they increased the Shah's prestige. I had no choice but to order him, in my own rash way, to refrain from giving further speeches until order was reestablished.

While the government tried to stop the sermons, Falsafi did not stop his sermons until the end of Ramadan. Throughout the 1950s the clergy continued to initiate the repression of the Baháʼí community; however, their efforts were checked by government ministers who, while they were sympathetic to the anti-Baháʼí sentiment, feared that the violence would get out of control and cause international criticism.

Also during the 1950s, the fundamentalist Islamic organization named Hojjatiyeh, whose central aim was to combat the Baháʼí Faith, was founded. Members of the group entered Baháʼí communities, and many of the Baháʼí arrests, imprisonments and executions are often attributed to Hojjatiyeh members having access to Baháʼí registration books. Also during the Pahlevi era, the Hojjatiyeh seem to have cooperated with SAVAK, the Iranian government's intelligence agency who had gathered information about the religious affiliation of Iranian citizens, to attack the Baháʼís.

Eliz Sanasarian states that while many Iranians blamed the Baháʼí persecution on Hojjatiyeh, which was the most visible anti-Baháʼí force, the silent Iranian majority "cannot avoid personal and communal responsibility for the persecutions of the Baháʼí in this extreme manner. To provide tacit support, to remain silent, ... do not excuse the majority for the actions based on prejudice and hate against an Iranian religious minority group."

In the late 1970s the Shah's regime, due to criticism that he was pro-Western, consistently lost legitimacy. As the anti-Shah movement gained ground and support, revolutionary propaganda was spread that some of the Shah's advisors were Baháʼís. Baháʼís were portrayed as economic threats, supporters of Israel and the West and popular hatred for the Baháʼís increased.

Islamic Revolution and Republic
The 1979 Islamic Revolution has refocused the persecutions against the Baháʼí Faith. Amnesty International and others report that 202 Baháʼís have been killed since the Islamic Revolution (see below), with many more imprisoned, expelled from schools and workplaces, denied various benefits or denied registration for their marriages. Additionally, several Baháʼí holy sites were destroyed in the revolution's aftermath, including the house of the Báb in Shiraz, the house of Baháʼu'lláh at Takur (in Mazandaran), and the resting place of Muhammad-Ali Barfurushi (Quddús) in Tehran.

The Islamic Republic has often stated that arrested Baha'is are being detained for "security issues" and are members of "an organized establishment linked to foreigners, the Zionists in particular," but according to Bani Dugal, the principal representative of the Baha'i International Community to the United Nations, "the best proof" that Baháʼís are being persecuted for their faith, not for anti-Iranian activity "is the fact that, time and again, Baha'is have been offered their freedom if they recant their Baha'i beliefs and convert to Islam ..."

During the Iranian revolution attacks against the Baháʼís increased. In 1979 Hojjatiyeh members took over the Baháʼí National Centre in Tehran and other cities and expelled staff and seized personnel files and membership lists. These files were later used by Hojjatiyeh including sending flyers in the mail warning Baháʼís of the consequences of continuing to believe in the Baháʼí beliefs. Also, once again, there were reports of mob attacks, arson, and deaths and murders against the Baháʼís across Iran; 22 Baháʼí cemeteries as well as hundreds of Baháʼí homes and businesses were damaged or destroyed. During December 1978 in Sarvestan, a city south of Shiraz, it was reported that several hundred Baháʼí houses were set on fire, and more than 1,000 Baháʼís were left homeless. Reports of the attacks suggest that they were not spontaneous, but that they were initiated by the military government appointed by the Shah, that SAVAK provided the addresses for Baháʼís, and when the army showed up they did not take action to prevent the fires from spreading. Further attacks happened throughout the country including Baháʼís who would not recant being fired at and having their homes destroyed; the violence continued even after the Shah fled Iran.

Islamic Republic

After the Shah left Iran on January 16, 1979, Ayatollah Khomeini returned on February 1, 1979, and started the process of creating a new government. During an interview before returning to Iran with Professor James Cockroft, Khomeini stated that Baháʼís would not have religious freedom:
Cockroft: Will there be either religious or political freedom for the Baháʼís under the Islamic government?
Khomeini: They are a political faction; they are harmful. They will not be accepted.
Cockroft: How about their freedom of religion– religious practice?
Khomeini: No.

The new government's spokesman in the United States said that while religious minorities would retain their religious rights emphasized that the Baháʼís would not receive the same treatment, since they believed that the Baháʼís were a political rather than religious movement. Bazargan, the provisional prime-minister, while being emphatic that all Iranians would enjoy the same rights, insisted that the Baháʼís were a political movement and would not be tolerated.

During the drafting of the new constitution the wording intentionally excluded the Baháʼís from protection as a religious community. Referring to the recordings of the proceedings of the official transcripts of the constitution drafting process, Sanasarian states that anti-Baháʼí thought was obvious as there was haggling "over every word and expression of certain articles to assure the exclusion of the Baháʼís." The final version of the constitution explicitly withheld recognition from the Baháʼís by stating in Article 13 that the "Zoroastrian, Jewish and Christian Iranians are the only recognized religious minorities..." Responding to international criticism due to the exclusion of the Baháʼís, spokesmen for the government stated, as before, that the Baháʼís were a "misguided group... whose affiliation and association with world Zionism is a clear fact" and that "Baháʼísm is not a religion, but a political doctrine."

Starting in late 1979 the new government of the Islamic Republic of Iran systematically targeted the leadership of the Baháʼí community by focusing on the Baháʼí National Spiritual Assembly (NSA) and Local Spiritual Assemblies (LSA). In November 1979, Ali Murad Davudi, the secretary of the NSA, was kidnapped and never seen again. In August 1980 all nine members of the National Spiritual Assembly were arrested while meeting at a private home. In a statement on September 10, 1980, then speaker of the House Ali Akbar Hashemi Rafsanjani, stated that an order for the arrests of the Baháʼís had been issued, but by October 9, 1980, Rafsanjani changed his statement and said that no members of the NSA were arrested. There has been no further news regarding the nine NSA members since their arrest in 1980, and their fate remains unknown, although there are reports that they were at some point held in Evin prison; they are now presumed dead. After the disappearance of the NSA members, the Iranian Baháʼí elected a new NSA. On December 13, 1981, eight of the nine new NSA members were arrested by the Iranian authorities, and were executed on December 27, 1981, without trial.

In addition to the execution of the members of two National Spiritual Assemblies, the members of Local Spiritual Assemblies throughout the country were also killed. Between April 1979 and December 1980 at least eight prominent Tehran Baháʼís were killed. In September 1980 in Yazd, fifteen Baháʼís were arrested, and after a graphic trial that was partially televised, seven of the Baháʼís were executed; the remaining eight were released after four months. In Tabriz in 1979 two prominent Baháʼís were executed and then in 1981 all nine members of the Tabriz LSA were executed. In Hamadan seven members of the LSA of Hamaden were executed by firing squad, and while the bodies were being prepared for the funeral it was found that six of the men were physically tortured before their death. In Shiraz between 1978 and 1981, the House of the Báb, a Baháʼí holy place, was destroyed, five prominent Baháʼís were executed, and more than 85 Baháʼís were arrested for interrogations; then in 1983 sixteen more Baháʼís were executed.

On August 29, 1983, the government announced a legal ban on all administrative and community activities of the Baháʼí community, which required the dissolution of the third National Spiritual Assembly and about 400 Local Spiritual Assemblies. The Baháʼí community complied with the ban, but the former members of the LSAs were routinely harassed, and seven members of the third NSA were eventually arrested and executed.

Secret memorandum
In February 1991, a confidential circular issued by the Supreme Cultural Revolution Council on "the Baháʼí question" and signed by Supreme Leader Khamenei himself, signaled an increase in efforts to suffocate the Iranian Baháʼí community through a more "silent" means. The document organized the methods of oppression used to persecute the Baháʼís, and contained specific recommendations on how to block the progress of the Baháʼí communities both inside and outside Iran. The document stated that the most excessive types of persecutions should be avoided and instead, among other things recommended, that Baháʼís be expelled from universities, "once it becomes known that they are Baháʼís," to "deny them employment if they identify themselves as Baháʼís" and to "deny them any position of influence."

The existence of this so called Golpaygani Memorandum was brought to the attention of the public in a report by the then UN Human Rights Commissioner Mr Galindo Pohl (E/CM4/1993/41, 28 January 1993), and the policy recommendations of the document are still in force.

Current situation
According to a US panel, attacks on Baháʼís in Iran have increased since Mahmoud Ahmadinejad became president. In the ten years following the 1979 revolution, more than 200 Baha'is were killed or executed, hundreds more were tortured or imprisoned, and tens of thousands lost jobs, access to education, and other rights – all solely because of their religious belief. Since 2005, more than 710 Baha'is have been arrested, and the number of Baha'is in prison has risen from fewer than five to a current figure of 136; roughly 600 more are engaged with the penal system: awaiting trial, for example, or awaiting sentencing. The incarcerated now include young mothers of nursing children (imprisoned with their infants). Since the summer of 2013, escalation of attacks has included both murder and attempted murder. These attacks are believed to be hate crimes that are religiously motivated.

In 2004, Iranian authorities demolished the shrine and grave site of Muhammad-Ali Barfurushi (Quddús), a Bábí leader. In late 2005, an anti-Baháʼí media campaign was launched in Iran, asserting that the religion was created by colonialist powers to subvert Islam and to subjugate the Muslim peoples of Iran. In 2006 Iranian officials arrested 54 Baháʼís, mostly young people, in Shiraz. In March and May 2008, the seven "senior members" who form the leadership of the Baháʼí community in Iran were arrested. Several agencies and experts and journals have published concerns about viewing the developments as a case of genocide: Roméo Dallaire, Genocide Watch, Sentinel Project for Genocide Prevention, the journals War Crimes, Genocide, & Crimes against Humanity and Journal of Genocide Research. A summary of 2013 incidents of prison sentences, fines and punishments showed that these were more than twice as likely to apply to Baháʼís as any other religious minority in Iran and that the total rate of such cases had gone up by 36% over 2012.

Arrest of Baháʼí leaders

On May 14, 2008, members of an informal body known as the Friends (Yaran) that oversaw the needs of the Baháʼí community in Iran were arrested and taken to Evin prison. Officers from the Ministry of Intelligence in Tehran searched and raided the homes of the six people in the early hours of May 14. The arrest of the six follow the detention of another Baháʼí leader in March, who was originally taken to answer questions relating to the burial of a Baháʼí in the Baháʼí cemetery in Mashad. The Iran Human Rights Documentation Center has stated that they are concerned for the safety of the Baháʼís, and that the recent events are similar to the disappearance of 25 Baháʼí leaders in the early 1980s. In May Amnesty International also announced an Action Alert about the arrests. At year's end all seven members of the Baháʼí national leadership and a total of at least 40 Baháʼís were imprisoned in Iran. On February 17, 2009, Iranian state run news agency, IRNA, reported that the Baháʼí leaders had been officially accused of espionage.

In June 2008, Nobel Laureate Shirin Ebadi volunteered to be their lawyer, and received threats against her life for defending the Baha'i community. On December 21 Ebadi's office of the Center for the Defense of Human Rights was raided and closed. On December 29, government security officers posing as tax officials raided Ebadi's private law offices, seizing office files and computers. A second lawyer, Abdolfattah Soltani, reportedly taking up the case is reported to have disappeared June 16.

The court case was postponed several times, but went ahead on January 12, 2010. Apparently no observers were allowed in the court, and the defence lawyers, who have had nearly no access to the defendants for two years, also had difficulty entering the court. The chairman of the U.S. Commission on International Religious Freedom said that it seems that the government has already predetermined the outcome of the case and is violating international human rights law. Further sessions were held on February 7, 2010, April 12, 2010, and June 12, 2010. On August 11, 2010, it became known that the court sentence was 20 years imprisonment for each of the seven prisoners, which was later reduced to ten years. After the sentence, they were transferred to Gohardasht prison. In March 2011 the sentences were reinstated to the original 20 years.

There have been widespread calls from public figures, governments and organizations to the Iranian government to release the Baháʼís, especially after the trial was announced on February 11, 2009. Members of government across the world including from Brazil, the United States, Canada, Germany, the United Kingdom, the Netherlands, Spain and Australia have either released statements or sponsored resolutions condemning the government of Iran for the arrest of the Baháʼí leaders. The Presidency of the European Union (EU), with the support of the EU associated countries denounced the trial.

Human rights organizations have also released statements: Amnesty International has released updated Action Alerts about the trial since 2009. Freedom House strongly condemned the trial, and World Organisation Against Torture proposed actions to secure the freedom of the leadership and others arrested. Responding to a letter from Roxana Saberi, who was in contact with two of the women Baháʼí leaders while she was in prison, the United States Commission on International Religious Freedom demanded the seven prisoners be freed rather than stand trial.

There have been groups of individuals also speaking out. On February 4, 2009, 267 non-Baháʼí Iranian academics, writers, artists, journalists and activists from some 21 countries including Iran signed an open letter of apology posted to Iranian.com and stating that they believed that the Baháʼís had been deprived of their rights in the Islamic Republic, they pledged their support to achieving for the Baháʼís in Iran the rights detailed in the Universal Declaration of Human Rights. British entertainers wrote an open letter printed in The Times of London about those on trial stating their solidarity with the Baháʼís." A prominent group of more than sixty professors and scholars who specialize in Middle Eastern and Iranian Studies have added their voices in protest as well. Others who have spoken out include Rainn Wilson and Shohreh Aghdashloo.

In February 2010, Iranian authorities detained five more members of the Baháʼís, reportedly including Niki Khanjani, daughter of Jamaloddin Khanjani, one of seven Baháʼí leaders jailed since 2008.

Arrest of 54 young people in Shiraz
On May 19, 2006 Iranian officials arrested 54 Baháʼís, mostly young people, in Shiraz, according to representatives of the International Baháʼí Community. Apparently the group was arrested during its participation in a community-service project teaching classes to underprivileged children, initiated by a local non-governmental organization. The group is reported to have had in its possession a letter of permission from the Islamic Council of Shiraz to undertake this service project at the time of its arrest. The nature of the charges against the Baháʼís is unknown at present as are the conditions under which the detainees are being held.

On the very same day, one of the 54 Baháʼís who had been arrested earlier but who was under the age of 15 was released without having to post bail. Several other young people who had been arrested along with the Baháʼís but who were not themselves Baháʼí were also released without posting bail.

"The arrests coincided with raids on six Baháʼí homes during which notebooks, computers, books, and other documents were confiscated," according to an article by the Baháʼí World News Service. The article further reports that since January, other than the aforementioned 54 detainees, "seven Baháʼís have been arrested and held for periods of up to one month in Kermanshah, Isfahan and Tehran.

On May 24, fourteen of the Baháʼís were released, each having been required to provide deeds of property to the value of ten million tumans (approximately US$11,000). On the following day 36 Baháʼís were released on the strength of either personal guarantees or the deposit of work licenses with the court as surety that they'd appear when summoned to court.

The last three of the group of 54 Baháʼís were released on 14 June. Although the judge originally demanded a bond equivalent to $54,000, they were released without bail on the promise that they would return for a later court appearance. No formal charges have been made against them. However, in most cases, some form of bail, such as deeds of property, were demanded before release. Currently, two Baháʼís, arrested in Tehran and Sanandaj, remain in prison.

On January 29, 2007, Iran's judiciary sentenced the 54 Baháʼí to four years in prison for propaganda against the regime. Part of the group, 51 Baháʼís, were given suspended one-year jail sentences conditional on their attendance of courses held by the Islamic Propaganda Organisation, which is organized by the government. Amnesty International has called for the release of the Baháʼís stating that they are "detained solely because of their religious beliefs, or their peaceful activities teaching underprivileged children."

On October 21, 2019, Intelligence Department officers arrested Shirazi Baháʼí residents, Farzan Masoumi, Kiana Shoaei, and Soroush Abadi. Following a search of their homes, the officers confiscated cell phones, computers, and laptops and other personal belongings. They are being held in an "undisclosed location, according to HRANA.

Monitoring of activities
A confidential letter sent on October 29, 2005, by the Chairman of the Command Headquarters of the Armed Forces in Iran states that the Supreme Leader of Iran, Ayatollah Khamenei, has instructed the Command Headquarters to identify people who adhere to the Baháʼí faith and to monitor their activities and gather any and all information about the members of the Baháʼí Faith. The letter was addressed to the Ministry of Information, the Revolutionary Guard and the Police Force. The letter was brought to the attention of the international community by Asma Jahangir, the Special Rapporteur of the United Nations Commission on Human Rights on freedom of religion or belief, in a March 20, 2006 press release.

In the press release, the Special Rapporteur states that she "is highly concerned by information she has received concerning the treatment of members of the Baháʼí community in Iran." The UN's press release summarizing Ms. Jahangir's report states:

The monitoring of Baháʼís has also been seen in other official government documents; in a letter dated 2 May 2006 from the Trades, Production, and Technical Services Society of Kermanshah to the Iranian Union of Battery Manufacturers, it was asked of the union to provide a list of members of "the Baha'i sect" in their membership. Furthermore, in a letter dated 19 August 2006, Iran's Ministry of the Interior to the Department of Politics and Security in Offices of the Governors' General throughout Iran ordered officials to step up the surveillance of Iranian Baháʼís throughout the country. Among the information requested in a detailed questionnaire about the activities of local Baháʼís is their financial status and social interactions.

The Anti-Defamation League has stated that the government's effort to identify and monitor Baháʼís is similar to what the Jews faced in the beginning of the Nazi era: they wrote the orders issued were "reminiscent of the steps taken against Jews in Europe and a dangerous step toward the institution of Nuremberg-type laws."

Deaths
Amnesty International and others report that 202 Baháʼís have been killed since the Islamic Revolution (see below). The most recent death of a Baháʼí in the custody of the Iranian government occurred on December 15, 2005, in the city of Yazd. Zabihullah Mahrami had been sentenced to death in 1995, but in 1999 this was commuted to life in prison.
His arrest was for the crime of apostasy against Islam, but he was convicted of spying for Israel. He was approximately 59 years old. He died in his prison cell of unknown causes. The United States condemned the imprisonment and alleged persecution of Zabihullah Mahrami, and State Department Deputy Spokesman, Adam Ereli, said that Mahrami had received death threats in prison and been forced to perform arduous physical labour.

The most recent Baháʼí execution apparently occurred in 1998, when the Iranian government hanged Ruhollah Rohani in Mashad on the charge of converting a woman to the faith though she herself stated that she had been a lifelong Baháʼí. Newspaper accounts describe this as the first Baháʼí execution in six years. Death sentences had also been passed against Sirus Zabhi-Moghaddam and Hedayat Kashefi-Najabadi, which have apparently not yet been carried out and Ataollah Hamid Nazrizadeh has received a ten-year prison sentence for related offences arising from the same situation.

Barriers to higher education

Baháʼí youth are not permitted to attend institutions of higher education in Iran unless prospective students identify themselves as followers of one of the four religions recognized by the state on university entrance exams. The Iranian government has said that if Baháʼís identify themselves as Muslims on the exams they would be allowed to enroll but Baháʼís, as a matter of religious principle, refuse to dissimulate their beliefs. Confirming these findings, an investigation by the Committee of Concerned Scientists also found that university officials in Iran had "received orders from above not to score the tests of Baha'i students," or that these officials had suggested that a student would receive his test scores only if the student's family renounced their faith. The Committee called for the complete publication of all test scores without discrimination.

In an effort which the New York Times called "an elaborate act of communal self-preservation," the Baháʼí community in 1987 established its own program of higher education to meet the educational needs of its young people, which evolved to become known as the Baháʼí Institute for Higher Education (BIHE), whose classes were held in private homes and had an enrollment of approximately 900 students. In 1998 (September 29 – October 2), Iranian authorities broke up the underground institution invading more than 500 homes of Baháʼí and office buildings in at least 14 cities around Iran. Hundreds were arrested. In addition to books and computer equipment confiscated, personal possessions such as silverware and refrigerators were taken in what was described as "thieve[ry] in the name of Islam."

Iranian columnist Iqbal Latif calls Iran's denial of access to university education for Baháʼís "[i]ntellectual cleansing of their ethnic brothers by the clergy-dominated regime."

Destruction of holy sites

In 1979, soon after their revolution, Iranian authorities ordered and encompassed the demolition of the House of the Báb in Shiraz. A mosque was later built on the site.

In April 2004, Iranian authorities demolished the shrine and grave site of Quddús, a Bábí leader. The following June, the Tehran house of Mírzá ʻAbbás Núrí, Baháʼu'lláh's father, was destroyed. The previous such incident occurred in 1993 when a Baháʼí cemetery in Tehran was bulldozed in order to build a municipal centre.

Seizure of property
Arbitrary confiscation of Baháʼí-owned property and shuddering of businesses is common in Iran. In the northern village of Rowshan Kuh, the Iranian authorities have seized and bulldozed properties on several occasions since 2016 on the pretext that they are encroaching on protected land, causing at least 18 farmers to lose their livelihoods as of August 2022. Meanwhile, in nearby Semnan province, authorities have shuddered at least 20 stores, 2 factories, and 2 agricultural businesses owned by Baháʼís since 2012. One court ruling in June 2022 justified the seizure of 18 Baháʼí properties in Semnan province on grounds that the Baháʼís "[engage] in illegal activities and espionage to the advantage of foreigners".

Media attacks
In the later months of 2005, an intensive anti-Baháʼí campaign was conducted by Iranian newspapers and radio stations. The state-run and influential Kayhan newspaper, whose managing editor is appointed by Iran's supreme leader, Ayatollah Khamenei, ran nearly three dozen articles defaming the Baháʼí Faith. The articles, which make use of fake historical documents, engage in a distortion of history to falsely describe Baháʼí moral principles in a manner that would be offensive to Muslims, thus inducing feelings of suspicion, distrust and hatred for members of the Baháʼí community in Iran.

The articles claim, in the face of all historical data, that the religion was invented and implanted by colonialist powers to subvert Islam and to subjugate the Muslim peoples of Iran. They use fake historical documents such as the memoirs of Prince Dolgorouki, a mid-nineteenth century Russian minister in Tehran, to substantiate their claims; the memoirs were however manufactured in Iran in 1937 and have long since been exposed as forgeries.

The articles also state that the Báb, one of the Baháʼí Faith's central figures, was taught simultaneously by the Jews and the Tsarist government of Russia, even though the Tsarist government was well-known to have been unfavourable towards the Jews. The Baháʼí World Centre claims that the linking of Baháʼís with Zionism serves to provoke suspicion and hatred towards the Baháʼís.

An Israeli mockumentary about the religion called Baha'is In My Backyard was released in 2006. According to the producer, the film was pirated, professionally dubbed and streamed by an Iranian website then altered again to make serious accusations against the Baháʼís using excerpts from the film on another Iranian website. Another attack was through national television – a "documentary" was televised called The Secret of Armageddon in the first half of 2008 which outlined a Jewish-Baháʼí conspiracy against Iranian interests.

In November 2009, the popular Iranian conservative newspaper Hamshahri, known to take a critical stand towards President Ahmadinejad, was closed down temporarily, only because it published in an advertisement for tourism travel to India a photograph of a temple of the Baha'i Faith. After the contested Iranian election of 2009 and the continuing unrest, the government increased its anti-Baháʼí rhetoric, blaming Baháʼís for the demonstrations, which observers have stated is without merit. The government of Iran has historically defined the Baháʼís as an 'other' to draw public attention away from the government.

In October 2011 the Baháʼí International community published a report titled "Inciting Hatred: Iran's Media Campaign to Demonize Baha'is", analyzing media items between late 2009 and early 2011.

Other events

In April 2005, Diane Ala'i, Baháʼí spokesperson to the United Nations in Geneva, described other forms of persecution to the UN Commission on Human Rights:

Ala'i also said that in March 2005, in Tehran, Iranian intelligence agents entered the homes of several Baháʼís and spent hours ransacking their houses before carting away their possessions and taking them into custody.

The Baháʼí's New York spokesperson, Bani Dugal, clarified some of the involved in December 2005:

Dugal said that although the majority of those Baháʼís who have been arrested were released, nine remained in prison as of late October [2005].

In May 2008, Albert Lincoln, secretary-general of the Baháʼí International Community, stated that in recent months there had been cases of arson, threats, kidnappings and beatings:

In April 2014 and November 2015, as a mark of solidarity with the Baháʼí community of Iran, Ayatollah Abdol-Hamid Masoumi-Tehrani gifted the Baháʼís a calligraphy work from the writings of Baháʼu'lláh. The Ayatollah's call for religious tolerance and co-existence has received worldwide support from religious leaders.

Statements

Since the later part of the 20th century many third party organizations have made statements regarding the persecution of Baháʼís asking that human rights be maintained. To date, the United Nations, Amnesty International, the European Union, the United States, Brazil, Australia, New Zealand, Austria, Canada, UK, Germany, France, Netherlands, Ireland, Hungary, Norway and India have made official statements condemning the treatment of Baháʼís abroad, in particular, in Iran.

The United Nations and the United Nations Commission on Human Rights have published reports on the persecution of the Baháʼís since the Iranian Revolution in 1979; in every year since 1984, except for 2002, the United Nations Commission on Human Rights has passed a resolution expressing concern about human rights violations against the Baháʼís in Iran. The Special Representative on Iran, Professor Galindo Pohl, Canadian Jurist and UBC Law Professor, Maurice Copithorne, and the Special Rapporteur on Religious Intolerance, Professor Abdu'l Fatah Amor, have all reported on the persecutions that the Baháʼís have faced in Iran. For example, in 1995 the commission wrote that "... the Baháʼís, whose existence as a viable religious community in the Islamic Republic of Iran is threatened ..." and in November 2005 they wrote that "... the escalation and increased frequency of discrimination and other human rights violations against the Baháʼí [sic], including cases of arbitrary arrest and detention, the denial of freedom of religion or of publicly carrying out communal affairs, the disregard of property rights, the destruction of sites of religious importance, the suspension of social, educational and community-related activities and the denial of access to higher education, employment, pensions, adequate housing and other benefits ...".

Amnesty International has also documented the persecution of the Baháʼí community in Iran. For example in 1998 it gave statements regarding the execution of a Baháʼí prisoner: "Amnesty International unreservedly condemns the execution of Ruhullah Rouhani and fears that he was executed for the nonviolent expression of his beliefs. Amnesty International currently knows of seven cases of Baháʼí prisoners under the sentence of death and is calling for commutation of these and all other death sentences without delay"

The European Union in the 2004 EU Annual Report on Human Rights wrote:

Then in a speech given at the European Parliament in October 2005 on behalf of the European Commissioner for Education, Training, Culture and Multilingualism, Jan Figel said:

The United States Department of State Bureau of Democracy, Human Rights and Labor stated in the 2004 Report on International Religious Freedom that "The Government harasses the Baháʼí community by arresting Baháʼís arbitrarily," that "the property rights of Baháʼís are generally disregarded, ... the Government has confiscated large numbers of private and business properties belonging to Baháʼís," and that "Public and private universities continue to deny admittance to Baháʼí students"

The Iranian government responds to these statements by saying that Baháʼís are enemies of the state, were supporters of the former Shah's government and spies employed by imperialist governments of the West. The Ayatollah Khomeini, even before his return to Iran said in an interview that he believed that Baháʼís were traitors — Zionists — and enemies of Islam.

The Iranian representative to the United Nations tried several times, albeit unsuccessfully, between 1982 and 1984 to convince the United Nations diplomatic community that the Baháʼí Faith is a politicized organization with a record of criminal activism against the Iranian government and not a legitimate religion like Judaism, Christianity, and Zoroastrianism which are protected under Iranian law; Iran has not acknowledged that the Baháʼí Faith is a religion. The United Nations responded to the Iranian government's accusations by stating that there has been no evidence of Iran's claims and that the Baháʼí community in Iran professes its allegiance to the state. The United Nations pointed to the Baháʼí teaching of obedience to the government of one's country and stated that any involvement in any subversive acts against the government would be antithetical to precepts of the Baháʼí religion. The United Nations also stated that if the Iranian government did acknowledge that the Baháʼí Faith is a religion, it would be an admission that freedom of religion does not apply to all in Iran and that it is not abiding by the Universal Declaration of Human Rights and International Covenants on Human Rights to which it is a signatory.

There are many Iranians who have published how and why Iranians think of Baháʼís as outsiders. Dr. Mohammad Tavakoli, a Muslim-Iranian, who is a Professor of Middle Eastern Studies at the University of Toronto presents in Iran-Nameh, a Persian language academic journal, a study that examines the processes that led to the ghettoization and eventual "othering" of the Baháʼís in Iran by the political and religious forces within Iranian society.

Egypt

In 1925, Egypt became the first Islamic state to legally recognize the Baháʼí Faith as an independent religion apart from Islam. Despite a historically active Egyptian Baháʼí community during the early twentieth century, Baháʼí institutions and community activities have been banned since 1960 by Law 263. This law was decreed by Egyptian President Gamal Abdel Nasser, seven years after the founding of the Arab Republic of Egypt. All Baháʼí community properties, including Baháʼí centers, libraries, and cemeteries, were confiscated by the government. The current Egyptian Baháʼí community, estimated to number between several hundred and two thousand, has also had fatwas issued against it by Al-Azhar's Islamic Research Center, which charges Baháʼís with apostasy.

In January 2001, 18 people, mostly Baháʼís, were arrested in the city of Sohag under the pretence of having violated Article 98(F) of the Penal Code ("insulting a heavenly religion") and other possible charges, 10 of whom were held in detention for over 10 months without being formally charged.

During and since the 2011 Egyptian revolution tensions have remained high, including homes being burnt, though Baháʼís made ongoing efforts to contribute to the dialog. Since 2011 Baháʼís while hopeful remain concerned and a Salafi spokesman has said of Baháʼís "We will prosecute the Bahai's (sic) on the charge of treason."

Identification-card controversy

The Egyptian identification card controversy began in the 1990s when the government modernized the electronic processing of identity documents, which introduced a de facto requirement that documents must list the person's religion as Muslim, Christian, or Jewish (the only three religions officially recognized by the government). Consequently, Baháʼís were unable to obtain government identification documents (such as national identification cards, birth certificates, death certificates, marriage or divorce certificates, or passports) necessary to exercise their rights within the country unless they lied about their religion, which conflicts with Baháʼí religious principles. Without documents, they could not be employed, educated, treated in hospitals, travel outside of the country, or vote, among other hardships.

Following a protracted legal process culminating in a court ruling favorable to the Baháʼís, the interior minister of Egypt released a decree on April 14, 2009, amending the law to allow Egyptians who are not Muslim, Christian, or Jewish to obtain identification documents that list a dash in place of one of the three recognized religions. The first identification cards were issued to two Baháʼís under the new decree on August 8, 2009. Under this compromise solution, the Baháʼí Faith is still unrecognized by the government – Islam, Christianity, and Judaism remain the only recognized religions.

Following the 2011 Egyptian revolution and comments by Dr. Ibrahim Ghoniem, acting Minister of Education and a member of the Muslim Brotherhood, in late 2012 it seemed that the Egyptian school system would exclude Baháʼí children and put in doubt the settlement of the identification card controversy.

Other countries

Africa
During the late 1970s, the Baháʼí Faith was banned in a number of countries in sub-Saharan Africa (Burundi, 1974; Mali 1976; Uganda 1977; Congo, 1978; and Niger, 1978).

Algeria

In late 1968, Baháʼí pioneers were expelled from Algeria, during the period of the independence of Algeria when the country adopted Islamic practices in rejection of colonial influences. Activities of the Baháʼí Faith were banned in Algeria in 1969.

Morocco

In Morocco there were episodes of religious persecution in 1962–1963, when 15 Baháʼís were arrested for their religious convictions; three were given death sentences and several others were sentenced to years of prison terms at hard labour. There were months of diplomatic efforts; US Senator Kenneth B. Keating stated in the U.S. Senate on February 18, 1963, "How far religious freedom under the Moroccan Constitution really applies, will be revealed in the coming weeks when the appeal before the Supreme Court [of Morocco] is heard." On March 31, 1963, during a visit to the United States and the United Nations, King Hasan of Morocco was interviewed on television and addressed the audience saying that even though the Baháʼí Faith was "against good order and also morals", he would pardon the death sentences. Persecution of Baha'is occurred again in 1984, and their response was to seek diplomatic redress emphasizing the non-partisanship and the obedience to government principles of the religion. Baháʼís have more recently been denied passports and can practice their religion only in private.

Asia

Afghanistan

Baháʼís were persecuted and imprisoned in Afghanistan during the rule of the Taliban. After the fall of the Taliban, one Baháʼí was arrested and the court has ruled that the Baháʼí Faith is not a recognized religion and therefore, Baháʼís have no rights under Islamic law.

India

The Baháʼís of Jaipur registered a complaint with police that their community burial ground had been attacked by a mob of about 40-50 Hindu people "led by a sarpanch", or head of the local gram panchayat, on Friday, October 31, 2015, about 11:30am in Shri Ram Ki Nangal village. The Hindu newspaper claimed the Sarpanch was Nathu Jangid, head of the village government, a member of the right-wing Bharatiya Janata Party based on a witness statement. Baháʼí community leaders have termed it the "first" such incident in India against their community.

Indonesia

Banning orders have been made against Baháʼí activities in Indonesia (especially but not exclusively 1962–2000).

While the government gave Baháʼís the freedom to exist as an organization in 2000, the national registration system continues to restrict the religious freedom of persons who do not belong to the five officially recognized faiths; thus Baháʼís cannot register their marriages or their children's births. Couples prevented from registering their marriages or the births of their children in accordance with their faiths must either convert to one of the five recognized faiths or misrepresent themselves. Those who choose not to register their marriages or their children's births risk future difficulties; for example, many children without a birth certificate cannot enroll in school or may not qualify for scholarships and individuals without birth certificates cannot qualify for government jobs.

Muslims who converted to the Baháʼí Faith in Sulawesi were intimidated by their neighbors and by the local government in 2007. Of seven households who converted, two returned to Islam, four refused to change, and the other ignored requests to convert again.

In August 2014, the Indonesian government officially recognized the monotheistic faith as a religion, and the then Religious Affairs Minister Lukman Hakim Saifuddin's made a statement that Baháʼí worshippers will be protected by the Constitution.

Iran 
On December 1, 2022, the House of Representatives passed  House Resolution 744, which condemns the Iranian government for persecuting the Baháʼí faith. The House Resolution 744 intends to point out the violation of human rights that are committed against the faith.

Iraq
A 1970 law prohibits the Baháʼí Faith in Iraq. A 1975 regulation forbade the issuance of national identity cards to Baháʼís until it was rescinded in 2007, but after only a few identity cards were issued to Baháʼís, their issuance was again halted.

Qatar
On March 31, 2021, Qatari authorities blacklisted and deported a prominent Qatar-born Baháʼí, Omid Seioshansian, on "unspecified criminal and national security charges." Over the years many Baháʼís have been blacklisted and deported from Qatar. Once blacklisted, Baháʼís are expelled from the country and are permanently refused reentry. Residency permits of non-Qatari Baháʼís have also been denied, or not renewed.

Uzbekistan

In Uzbekistan, Baháʼís have been subject to raids and expulsions.

Vietnam

Between 1975 and 1992, the government of Vietnam forbade the open practice of the Baháʼí Faith, which appears to have precipitated a sharp drop in membership.

Yemen
In 2018, the Houthi movement in Yemen filed charges against 20 Baháʼís in the country. Six who were held in detention were released in 2020.

Azerbaijan

In Azerbaijan, a region that has some of the earliest connections with the Baháʼí Faith, there have been several news stories covering severe social, bureaucratic and legal limits on religious communities, including the Baháʼís, since the fall of the Soviet Union. Baháʼís are trying to recover properties that were confiscated in the 1930s. In 2004, Tavachur Aliev, a Baháʼí, claimed to have been arrested for mentioning his religion and was released when he promised not to mention his religion again. Furthermore in 2006, laws were being considered that would curtail the rights and privileges of Baháʼís and other religious minorities.

Europe

Germany

The Baháʼí Faith was banned in Germany by the Nazi authorities in 1937.

Romania
Romania has had a Baháʼí community since 1926, whose members at that time included Marie of Edinburgh, Queen of Romania. After the fall of communism in Romania, the Romanian Baháʼí community organized itself in order to form its first National Spiritual Assembly in 1991. In 2005 the Romanian Baháʼí community numbered some 7,000, but in January 2007 a law was passed that imposed restrictive requirements on religious communities that wished to be recognized by the government, which Baháʼís and adherents of other minority religions could not meet. Some of the restrictions include waiting as long as twelve years after petitioning before a religious community can start to apply for recognition and the requirement that a legally-recognized religion must have over 22,000 members.

See also

 Baháʼí Faith by country
 Baháʼí Faith in Niger
 Baháʼí Faith in Turkmenistan
 Baháʼí Faith in Uganda
 Iran Human Rights Documentation Center
 Mona Mahmudnizhad
 Iranian Taboo, a documentary film
 Political objections to the Baháʼí Faith

Notes

References

B. Frelick. Iranian Baháʼí and genocide early warning. Social Science Record, 24(2):35–37, 1987.
 
Christopher Buck. Islam and Minorities: The Case of the Baháʼís. Studies in Contemporary Islam, 5(1):83–106, 2003.
Handal, Boris. "From Moorish Cordova to the Baháʼís of Iran: Islamic tolerance and intolerance". IDEA journal of social issues, 12(1), 2007.
Nazila Ghanea. Human Rights, the UN & the Baháʼís in Iran. Kluwer Law International, The Hague/London/New York, 2002.
R. Cooper. The Baháʼís of Iran. The Minority Rights Group Report 51. The Minority Rights Group LTD, London, UK, 1985.

Further reading
 The Bahaʼi Question Revisited: Persecution and Resilience in Iran, a 2016 report from the Baha'i International Community.
The Baháʼí Question: Cultural Cleansing in Iran, a Baha'i International Community document (2008).
Assimilation, Exodus, Eradication: Iraq's minority communities since 2003, a report by Minority Rights Group International.
, by Iran Human Rights Documentation Center.

External links

Archives of Bahaʼi Persecution in Iran
Current Situation of Baha’is in Iran, the Baha'i International Community's news page summarizing the current human rights conditions for Baha'is in Iran.
Persecution of Baha'is in Iran – A timeline from the Iranian Revolution to the present. [Archived]
Iran Press Watch (Wikipedia: Iran Press Watch) - A research entity documenting the struggle of the Iranian Baha’i Community to gain legitimate civil rights

 
Bahá'í Faith in Egypt
Bahá'í Faith in Iran
Human rights abuses in Egypt
Human rights abuses in Iran
Persecution by Muslims